The Fall River is a  tributary of the Big Thompson River in Larimer County, Colorado.  The river's source is near the Alpine Visitor Center in Rocky Mountain National Park.  It flows down a canyon and over Chasm Falls before a confluence with the Big Thompson in Estes Park.

See also
 List of rivers of Colorado

References

Rivers of Rocky Mountain National Park
Rivers of Larimer County, Colorado
Tributaries of the Platte River